Ilex brevipedicellata is a species of plant in the family Aquifoliaceae. It is endemic to Venezuela.

References

brevipedicellata
Endemic flora of Venezuela
Vulnerable flora of South America
Taxonomy articles created by Polbot